Philosophical Topics is a peer-reviewed academic journal covering all major areas of philosophy. Each thematic issue consists entirely of invited papers. Recent issues have been concerned with perception, agency, modern philosophy, identity, and free will. The journal is published by the University of Arkansas philosophy department and the University of Arkansas Press. The editor-in-chief is Jack Lyons.

Philosophical Topics was established in 1970 as The Southwestern Journal of Philosophy and obtained its current title in 1981. All issues of both journals are available in electronic format from the Philosophy Documentation Center.

See also 
 List of philosophy journals and philosophy

External links 
 
 The Southwestern Journal of Philosophy online

English-language journals
Philosophy journals
Biannual journals
Publications established in 1981
University of Arkansas
Philosophy Documentation Center academic journals